Glenrae may refer to:

 Glenrae River, a river in New Zealand
 Glenrae, Queensland, a locality in the North Burnett Region, Queensland, Australia